Emilio Ferrer (born 8 September 1904, date of death unknown) was a Spanish long-distance runner. He competed in the marathon at the 1928 Summer Olympics.

References

External links
 

1904 births
Year of death missing
Athletes (track and field) at the 1928 Summer Olympics
Spanish male long-distance runners
Spanish male marathon runners
Olympic athletes of Spain
Place of birth missing